Donna Consuelo Wilkes (born  1958–1961) is an American actress. She began her career as a child actor in commercials before making her feature film debut in Jaws 2 (1978). She subsequently had a supporting role in Almost Summer (1978), followed by lead roles in the horror films Schizoid (1980) and Blood Song (1982). She also appeared in several television programs, including the soap opera Days of Our Lives (1982–1983), portraying Pamela Prentiss. She portrayed Diane Alder in the short-lived sitcom Hello, Larry (1979), a role she reprised in a spin-off episode of Diff'rent Strokes.

Wilkes is perhaps best known for her starring role in the thriller Angel (1984), in which she portrayed a preparatory student in Los Angeles who lives a double life as a prostitute by night. Her other credits include the horror film Grotesque (1988), opposite Linda Blair and Tab Hunter, and guest-starring roles on the series Dragnet (1989) and FBI: The Untold Stories (1991).

Wilkes abandoned her acting career in the early 1990s after the birth of her daughter. She returned to acting in 2013, appearing in the independent films My Stepbrother Is a Vampire!?! and 90210 Shark Attack (2014).

Biography

Early life
Wilkes was born in Manhattan, New York City in Spanish Harlem. Her father was Wayman Otis Wilkes (19182013), an Irish American chiropractor originally from Texas, while her mother, a nightclub singer from El Salvador, was of Spanish and French descent. Wilkes's parents divorced when she was 3 months old. She was raised speaking both English and Spanish, and is fluent in both.

When she was six she made her first commercial, for Keds sneakers. She trained in acting at Dominica American Theatre of Performing Arts, but stopped her training at age 11 to become a "normal student." At age 12, she went to live with her aunt and uncle in the Dominican Republic. Wilkes attended the Collegio Santo Domingo where she was an advanced student, graduating at age 14. At age 15, she moved to Los Angeles, California, but, unable to work at such a young age, convinced many employers that she was 18 and married. Her first jobs included being a computer operator for an ambulance service, and as a secretary and administrative assistant for a large corporation.

Career beginnings
Wilkes began acting again at age 17. Her first role was the part of Jackie Peters in the 1978 Universal Pictures film Jaws 2. That same year, she starred as Meredith in Almost Summer, which earned her a Screen Actors Guild (SAG) card. At around age 18, she married 39-year-old actor Billy Gray, known for his work on Father Knows Best. The marriage soon ended in divorce.

In 1980, Wilkes portrayed the mentally-unstable daughter of a psychologist (played by Klaus Kinski) in the horror film Schizoid. She subsequently starred in the Oregon-shot slasher film Blood Song (1982) opposite Frankie Avalon, playing a disabled young woman stalked by a maniacal killer with whom she has a telepathic connection.

Angel, hiatus, and later career
Wilkes had a central role as Pamela Prentiss on the soap opera Days of Our Lives from 1983 to 1984.

She subsequently gained international attention for her leading role in the cult sexploitation film Angel, in which she played Molly "Angel" Stewart, a high school honor student by day, and a prostitute by night, opposite Cliff Gorman, Susan Tyrrell, Dick Shawn, and Rory Calhoun. The film spawned three unsuccessful sequels in which Wilkes had no involvement. Wilkes was 22 or so at the time she played the 15-year-old character. To prepare for the role, she spent time in halfway houses and rehabilitation centers in Los Angeles. Released by New World Pictures in January 1984, Angel was a box-office hit, grossing $17.5 million in the United States.

Following Angel, Wilkes continued to work in television, making guest appearances on the series Partners in Crime (1984), Hell Town (1985), and Dragnet (1989). She also had a supporting role in the horror film Grotesque (1988), co-starring with Linda Blair and Tab Hunter.

Wilkes abandoned her acting career in the early 1990s after giving birth to her daughter. She returned to acting in the 2010s, appearing in the independent films My Stepbrother Is a Vampire!?! (2013), 90210 Shark Attack (2014) and Buzz Cut (2021).

Filmography

Film

Television

Notes

References

Sources

External links

Actresses from New York City
American film actresses
American people of French descent
American people of Irish descent
American people of Salvadoran descent
American people of Spanish descent
Hispanic and Latino American actresses
Living people
People from East Harlem
21st-century American women
Year of birth missing (living people)